Travers John Heagerty (5 March 1874 – 18 October 1965), known professionally as Henry Travers, was an English film and stage character actor. His best known role was the guardian angel Clarence Odbody in the 1946 film It's a Wonderful Life. He also received an Academy Award nomination for his supporting role in Mrs. Miniver (1942). Travers specialized in portraying slightly bumbling but friendly and lovable older men.

Early life
Travers was born in Prudhoe, Northumberland, and was the son of Daniel Heagerty, a doctor originally from Ireland, and Ellen Gillman Hornibrook. His mother was a native of County Cork, Ireland, and was previously married to William H. Belcher, a merchant seaman. He died in 1869. Travers had a half-brother, Samuel William Belcher, by his mother's previous marriage. He also had another brother, Daniel George Belsaigne Heagerty, and a sister, Mary Sophia Maude Heagerty. Travers grew up in Berwick-upon-Tweed, and many biographies wrongly report him as being born there.

The Travers family lived in Prudhoe for a couple of years before moving from Woodburn, on the A68 road near Corsenside, Northumberland, in about 1866, to Tweedmouth, Berwick-upon-Tweed, in about 1876.

Initially, he trained as an architect at Berwick, before taking to the stage under the name Henry Travers.

Acting career 

Travers gained early experience acting in repertory theatre in England. He was billed as Travers Heagerty for a December 1895 production. He played character roles almost from the beginning of his acting career in 1894, often figures who were much older than himself. He made his Broadway debut in The Price of Peace (1901) but returned to England. Travers settled in the United States and played frequently from November 1917 until December 1938 on Broadway in over 30 plays, and was described in The New Yorker as 'one of the most consistent performers now in the American theatre, and at the same time one of its least appreciated'. His last play on Broadway You Can't Take It with You was his best known, where he acted in over 380 performances in two years. In the Oscar-winning movie You Can't Take It With You, Lionel Barrymore played the role which Travers had portrayed on Broadway.

Like many other theatre actors, he made his first movie only with the advent of sound films. His first was Reunion in Vienna in 1933. In the same year, he played the father of Gloria Stuart in the horror film The Invisible Man.  He often portrayed doctors, judges, and fathers of the main figures in supporting roles. Travers specialized on portraying slightly wry and bumbling but friendly and lovable older men. He appeared with Greer Garson and Ronald Colman in Random Harvest (1942) and with Bing Crosby and Ingrid Bergman in The Bells of St. Mary's (1945). Alfred Hitchcock used Travers as a Comic relief in Shadow of a Doubt (1943), where he played a bank clerk with a passion for criminal magazines. The character actor also portrayed the Railway Station Master Mr. Ballard with a love for roses who finally wins the annual flower show in his village shortly before dying in a bombardment in Mrs. Miniver. He received an Academy Award-nomination as Best Supporting Actor for this appearance.

Travers's best remembered role was as James Stewart's somewhat befuddled but kind-hearted guardian angel Clarence Odbody in Frank Capra's 1946 film It's a Wonderful Life. Travers' character saves Stewart's from committing suicide, and then shows him how wonderful his life really is. Though the film was a financial flop, it later became a Christmas perennial.

Travers retired in 1949 after his supporting role in The Girl From Jones Beach. Overall, he acted in 52 films.

Personal life and death 
Travers' first wife was actress Amy Forrest-Rhodes. They were married from 1931 until her death in 1954. In 1955, he married Ann G. Murphy, who survived him.

After several years in retirement, Travers died as a result of arteriosclerosis in 1965, at the age of 91. He is interred with his second wife in Forest Lawn Memorial Park in Glendale, California.

The Maltings Theatre in Berwick-upon-Tweed has a performance space, The Henry Travers Studio, named after him.

Filmography

 Reunion in Vienna (1933) as Father Krug
 Another Language (1933) as Pop Hallan
 My Weakness (1933) as Ellery Gregory
 The Invisible Man (1933) as Dr. Cranley
 Death Takes a Holiday (1934) as Baron Cesarea
 Born to Be Bad (1934) as Fuzzy
 The Party's Over (1934) as Theodore
 Ready for Love (1934) as Judge Pickett
 Maybe It's Love (1935) as Mr. Halevy
 After Office Hours (1935) as Cap
 Captain Hurricane (1935) as Capt. Ben
 Four Hours to Kill! (1935) as Mac Mason
 Escapade (1935) as Concierge
 Pursuit (1935) as Thomas 'Tom' Reynolds
 Seven Keys to Baldpate (1935) as Adalbert 'Lem' Peters / The Hermit
 Too Many Parents (1936) as Wilkins
 The Sisters (1938) as Ned Elliott
 You Can't Get Away with Murder (1939) as Pop
 Dodge City (1939) as Dr. Irving
 Dark Victory (1939) as Dr. Parsons
 On Borrowed Time (1939) as Dr. Evans
 Stanley and Livingstone (1939) as John Kingsley
 The Rains Came (1939) as Rev. Homer Smiley
 Remember? (1939) as Judge Milliken
 Primrose Path (1940) as Gramp
 Edison, the Man (1940) as Ben Els
 Anne of Windy Poplars (1940) as Matey
 Wyoming (1940) as Sheriff
 High Sierra (1941) as Pa
 A Girl, a Guy and a Gob (1941) as Abel Martin
 The Bad Man (1941) as Mr. Hardy
 I'll Wait for You (1941) as Mr. Miller
 Ball of Fire (1941) as Prof. Jerome
 Mrs. Miniver (1942) as Mr. Ballard
 Pierre of the Plains (1942) as Percival Wellsby
 Random Harvest (1942) as Dr. Sims
 Shadow of a Doubt (1943) as Joseph Newton
 The Moon Is Down (1943) as Mayor Orden
 Madame Curie (1943) as Eugene Curie
 None Shall Escape (1944) as Father Warecki
 Dragon Seed (1944) as Third Cousin
 The Very Thought of You (1944) as Pop Wheeler
 Thrill of a Romance (1945) as Hobart Glenn
 The Naughty Nineties (1945) as Capt. Sam Jackson
 The Bells of St. Mary's (1945) as Horace P. Bogardus
 Gallant Journey (1946) as Thomas Logan
 The Yearling (1946) as Mr. Boyles
 It's a Wonderful Life (1946) as guardian angel Clarence Odbody
 The Flame (1947) as Dr. Mitchell
 Beyond Glory (1948) as Pop Dewing
 The Accused (1949) as Blakely, Romley's Assistant (uncredited)
 The Girl From Jones Beach (1949) as Judge Bullfinch (final film role)

References

External links

Henry Travers on television

1874 births
1965 deaths
19th-century English male actors
20th-century English male actors
Burials at Forest Lawn Memorial Park (Glendale)
Deaths from arteriosclerosis
English emigrants to the United States
English male film actors
English male stage actors
English people of Irish descent
People from Berwick-upon-Tweed
People from Prudhoe
Actors from Northumberland